Zivan Smith (born 31 October 1991 in Pretoria, South Africa) is a South African Paralympic athlete. Smith has the use of only one arm, and completes in the T46 class. He attends Tshwane University of Technology in South Africa.

At the 2012 Paralympic Games, Smith won a gold medal as part of the South African 4 × 100 m relay team in a world record time of 41.78 seconds.

References

1991 births
Living people
Paralympic athletes of South Africa
Medalists at the 2012 Summer Paralympics
Paralympic gold medalists for South Africa
Sportspeople from Pretoria
South African amputees
World record holders in Paralympic athletics
Athletes (track and field) at the 2012 Summer Paralympics
Tshwane University of Technology alumni
Paralympic medalists in athletics (track and field)
South African male sprinters